Television in North Macedonia was first introduced in 1964; it remains the most popular news medium. The public broadcaster is the Macedonian Radio Television, founded in 1993. TEKO TV (1989) from Štip is the first private television channel in the country. Other popular private channels are: Sitel, Kanal 5, Telma, Alfa TV, Alsat-M and TV 24.Most private media are tied to political or business interests and state media tend to support the government. Public broadcast networks face stiff competition from commercial stations, which dominate the ratings. A European Union sponsored report says that with scores of TV and radio networks, the market is overcrowded and many local broadcasters are struggling to survive financially.

DVB-T 
DVB-T was introduced in Republic of North Macedonia in November, 2009 as a Pay TV platform known as BoomTV by ONE. The platform includes national channels with national frequency and the most popular world channels. Boom TV is using 3 multiplexes (MUX 1, MUX 2 and MUX 3). 
The DVB-T switch off in the country was completed on 1 June 2013.
MRD (Republic of Macedonia Broadcasting Council) operates and maintains the DVB-T network in the Republic of North Macedonia and the public Macedonian Radio Television using MUX 4 and MUX 5 while ONE operates the private national and local TV stations in North Macedonia using MUX 6 and MUX 7.

The DVB-T transmissions in North Macedonia are standard-definition and high-definition, MPEG-4, X7F modulation, 64-QAM, 2/3 Code-rate.

IPTV 
On 17 November 2008, IPTV was officially launched when the country's first IPTV service, MaxTV, was launched by Makedonski Telekom.

Cable television 
Cable television is highly developed, with cable television penetration in Skopje at 67% of all households. There are 49 cable TV providers with the two majors A1 and Telekabel holding 80% of the market. The two majors offer cable television in both analogue and digital, and they have also introduced triple play at the beginning of 2007.

Public television stations with national frequency 
MRT 1
MRT 2
MRT Sobraniski Kanal

TV Channels at the state level through the operator of digital terrestrial multiplex
Sitel TV
Kanal 5
Alfa TV
Telma TV
Alsat-M

TV Channels at the state level through public electronic communications network
TV Art

TV Channels at the state level through satellite
Sitel 3
Kanal 5 plus
TV 24
Naša TV
TV Sonce

TV Channels at the regional level through public electronic communications network that uses limited resources

TV Skajnet
TV Tera
TV M

High-definition television stations 
MRT 1 HD
MRT 2 HD
MRT 3 HD
Sitel HD
Kanal 5 HD
Alfa HD

Macedonian television stations on satellite 
MRT 1
MRT Sat
MRT 2 Sat
Sitel
Sitel 3
Kanal 5
Kanal 5 plus
Alfa TV
24 Vesti
 Naša TV
TV Sonce
TV ERA

International channels translated into Macedonian 

Channels marked with an asterisk (*) have a Macedonian audio channel, all others have Macedonian subtitles only

FOX TV
Fox Life 
Fox Crime 
24Kitchen 
AXN Adria*
Discovery Channel
Animal Planet
Discovery Travel & Living
E! Entertainment 
HBO Adria*
HBO Comedy*
DaVinci Learning
National Geographic Channel
History Channel
MTV Adria
OrlandoKids*
CineStar TV
CineStar Action and Thriller
Viasat Film
Viasat History
Viasat Nature
Viasat Explore
Animal Planet HD
Discovery HD Showcase
Travel Channel
Tring Max
FilmBOX HD
FilmBOX Plus
DocuBOX HD

See also
Lists of television channels
Television
List of language television channels
Television in Europe

References

External links
Alsat-M
Mktv
Sitel
Kanal 5
Telma TV
Orbis TV
Medi